Amigo is a game show for kids in Norway. The host is Stian Barsnes Simonsen, who is also the host for Melodi Grand Prix Junior with Nadia Hasouni. Amigo has an individual named The Soundeffect-man. The format consists of three teams, with two children each. The children make their own version of the Amigo theme song, which they then sing. The show is recorded in the NRK studio in Oslo, Norway.

Seasons
Season 1: October 22, 2005 - December 30, 2005
Season 2: November 11, 2006 - December 30, 2006

External links
Amigo's Official website
Amigo's Official website on NRK Web-TV

Children's game shows
Norwegian game shows